Pomme de Terre is an extinct town in section 24 of Pomme de Terre Township in Grant County, Minnesota, United States.  Content referring to Fort Pomme de Terre or the stockade have been removed as they were not at the same location.  The fort site was located about 1 1/2 miles east of the village site.

History

Pomme de Terre was the first village settled in Grant County in 1868.  It was settled by Timothy Heald, Joseph Pennock and Frank Smith and platted in 1874 by Timothy Heald in section 24 of Pomme de Terre Township.  The site was chosen for its location of where the stagecoach road from St. Cloud, Minnesota to Fort Abercrombie (on the Red River) crossed the Pomme de Terre River.   

In 1871, N.Q. Puntches moved his general merchandise stock from the old stockade (Fort Pomme de Terre, located about 1 1/2 miles to the east) to the village.  Frank Williams and August Schaeffer built a grist mill in 1873.  The grist mill burned down in August 1887.  At the time the mill was shipping out three carloads of flour each week.  

A post office existed during the years 1868-79, and 1880 to 1902. At its height, Pomme de Terre had two stores, two blacksmith shops, a grist mill, elevator, hotel and saloon.

In April 1873, the first county commissioners for Grant County, Henry F.  Sanford, K.N.O. Melby and S.S. Frogner, met in N.Q. Puntches store for the purpose of choosing the county seat.  A motion to locate the county seat at Pomme de Terre failed.  It was instead located at what is now Elbow Lake. The development of Herman, the growth of Elbow Lake as the county seat, and the failure of the railroad to come through Pomme de Terre (going instead to the north through Ashby) led to the eventual demise of the village.

Etymology
The name Pomme de Terre is French and is translated as "apple of the earth," which usually refers to the potato. In this case, however, it refers to the prairie turnip (Psoralea esculenta), a potato-like root vegetable which was commonly eaten by the Sioux.

References

Former populated places in Minnesota
Former populated places in Grant County, Minnesota